Angelique Quessandier (born 13 August 1986) is a visually impaired French judoka who competes in international level events. She has participated in two Paralympic Games and winning two bronze medals for her country.

References

External links 
 

1986 births
Living people
French female judoka
Paralympic judoka of France
Judoka at the 2004 Summer Paralympics
Judoka at the 2008 Summer Paralympics
Medalists at the 2004 Summer Paralympics
Medalists at the 2008 Summer Paralympics
Paralympic medalists in judo
Paralympic bronze medalists for France
21st-century French women